Pseudocharopa is a genus of three species of pinwheel snails that are endemic to Australia's Lord Howe Island in the Tasman Sea.

Species
 Pseudocharopa exquisita Peile, 1929 – exquisite pinwheel snail
 Pseudocharopa ledgbirdi (Brazier, 1889) – Mount Lidgbird pinwheel snail
 Pseudocharopa whiteleggei (Brazier, 1889) – Whitelegge's pinwheel snail
Species brought into synonymy
 Pseudocharopa editor Iredale, 1944: synonym of Pseudocharopa whiteleggei (Brazier, 1889) (junior synonym)
 Pseudocharopa gowerensis Iredale, 1944: synonym of Pseudocharopa ledgbirdi (Brazier, 1889) (junior synonym)
 Pseudocharopa imperator Iredale, 1944: synonym of Pseudocharopa ledgbirdi (Brazier, 1889) (junior synonym)

Distribution and habitat
The snails in this genus are rare. They are known only from the summits and upper slopes of Mount Lidgbird and Mount Gower, in leaf litter or on exposed rocks.

References

 
 
Gastropod genera
Gastropods of Lord Howe Island
Taxa named by Alfred James Peile